The PZL TS-16 Grot (Arrowhead) was a supersonic Strike aircraft and military jet trainer designed in Poland by Tadeusz Sołtyk.  It is the first jet made without any foreign support from the East, and its creation was received very coldly by both the Kremlin and by the West (since Poland was under Soviet protection at the time). The project was started in 1958, but was canceled in 1964 for political pressure by USSR, before production could start.  Despite this, a mockup designated TS-16RD was built. The RD version was expected to use Soviet RD-9B engine from the MiG-19 although an indigenous powerplant called the SO-2 was also in development for the final version. The production version was to have two engines, although the TS-16RD prototype that was built had only one.

Variants

TS-16Asingle seat attack version, powered by 2x SO-2 engines.
TS-16Btwo-seat two-engine trainer, powered by 2x SO-2 engines.
TS-16RD-Aearly single-engined. single-seat prototype.
TS-16RD-Bearly single-engined, two-seat prototype.

Specifications (TS-16RD-A)

Similar aircraft
SEPECAT Jaguar
J-22 Orao
Mitsubishi F-1

References

Polish military aircraft